Minoa is a village in Onondaga County, New York, United States. As of the 2010 census, the village population was 3,449. Minoa is in the northern part of the town of Manlius and is east of Syracuse.

History 
Minoa is in the former Central New York Military Tract. It was known as "Manlius Station" - a stop on the Syracuse-Utica railroad (completed in 1839) - until the name was changed to Minoa in 1895.

The village was incorporated in 1913. The village was a prominent railroad community.

Notable person
Larry Costello, former professional basketball player and coach; member of the Basketball Hall of Fame

Geography
Minoa is located at  (43.077067, -76.006955).

Demographics

As of the census of 2000, there were 3,348 people, 1,249 households, and 940 families residing in the village. The population density was 2,700.3 people per square mile (1,042.5/km2). There were 1,293 housing units at an average density of 1,042.8 per square mile (402.6/km2). The racial makeup of the village was 96.62% White, 0.51% African American, 0.42% Native American, 1.43% Asian, 0.03% Pacific Islander, 0.21% from other races, and 0.78% from two or more races. Hispanic or Latino of any race were 0.57% of the population.

There were 1,249 households, out of which 38.4% had children under the age of 18 living with them, 58.1% were married couples living together, 13.5% had a female householder with no husband present, and 24.7% were non-families. 20.7% of all households were made up of individuals, and 9.3% had someone living alone who was 65 years of age or older. The average household size was 2.62 and the average family size was 3.03.

In the village, the population was spread out, with 26.1% under the age of 18, 7.0% from 18 to 24, 28.0% from 25 to 44, 25.1% from 45 to 64, and 13.8% who were 65 years of age or older. The median age was 39 years. For every 100 females, there were 88.6 males. For every 100 females age 18 and over, there were 83.9 males.

The median income for a household in the village was $49,100, and the median income for a family was $57,200. Males had a median income of $38,235 versus $28,689 for females. The per capita income for the village was $19,591. About 2.1% of families and 2.0% of the population were below the poverty line, including 1.3% of those under age 18 and 2.8% of those age 65 or over.

Government 
The mayor is William F. Brazill and the deputy mayor is John H. Champagne. The trustees are John Abbott, Eric Christensen, and Robert Schepp.

References

External links
 Village of Minoa official website

Villages in New York (state)
Syracuse metropolitan area
Villages in Onondaga County, New York
Manlius, New York